The Act to Protect the Province Against Communistic Propaganda, commonly known as the "Padlock Law" or "Padlock Act", was a law in the province of Quebec, Canada that allowed the Attorney General of Quebec to close off access to property suspected of being used to propagate or disseminate communist propaganda. The law was introduced by the Union Nationale government of Maurice Duplessis and made it illegal to "use [a house] or allow any person to make use of it to propagate Communism or Bolshevism by any means whatsoever". This included printing, publishing or distributing of "any newspaper, periodical, pamphlet, circular, document or writing, propagating Communism or Bolshevism". Violations of the Act subjected such property to closure by the Attorney General, including the locking of access doors with padlocks, against any use whatsoever for a period of up to one year and any person found guilty of involvement in prohibited media activities could be incarcerated for three to thirteen months.

The law was extremely vague; it did not define Communism or Bolshevism in any concrete way. It denied both the presumption of innocence and freedom of speech to individuals. There were also concerns that the law would be used in order to arrest individual activists from international trade unions. Two union leaders were nearly arrested in that period. Reports that it was used against the Jehovah's Witnesses are incorrect: the authorities typically used municipal by-laws, such as the one featured in Saumur v City of Quebec.

The federal government under Liberal Prime Minister William Lyon Mackenzie King could have used its power of disallowance to nullify the Padlock Law, as it had done to overturn equally controversial laws that had been passed by Alberta's Social Credit government around the same time. However, King chose not to intervene in Quebec.

The Supreme Court of Canada's 1957 decision in Switzman v Elbling struck down the law as ultra vires of the provincial government because it was an attempt by the province to enact a statute respecting criminal law, which is the exclusive domain of the federal parliament under the Constitution of Canada. In their concurrence, justices Ivan Rand, Roy Kellock and Douglas Abbott also argued the law was ultra vires because it contravened an implied bill of rights that underlies the Canadian constitution, but this view was not shared by the rest of the majority.

Gallery

References

External links 
 Documents on the Padlock Law from Marianopolis College
 Canadian Rights Movement for the Padlock Act

1937 in Canadian law
1937 in Quebec
Anti-communism in Canada
Censorship in Canada
History of human rights in Canada
History of mass media in Canada
Media legislation
Political history of Quebec
Political repression in Canada
Quebec provincial legislation
Real property law
Repealed Canadian legislation